Nappa is a village in northern Kymenlaakso. It emerged in mid-17th century arising from the residential area and is now part of Kouvola and has grown to more than a thousand inhabitants.

Villages in Finland